Rolf Burggraf (born 31 October 1937) is a Swiss former swimmer. He competed in the men's 100 metre backstroke at the 1960 Summer Olympics, where he was eliminated in the heats.

References

External links
 

1937 births
Living people
Swiss male backstroke swimmers
Olympic swimmers of Switzerland
Swimmers at the 1960 Summer Olympics
Sportspeople from Basel-Stadt
20th-century Swiss people